Muhammad Amjad Khan Niazi  (Urdu: محمد امجد خان نیازی), is an Admiral in the Pakistan Navy who is the 17th and current Chief of Naval Staff of Pakistan. He assumed charge on October 7, 2020, after succeeding Zafar Mahmood Abbasi. He previously served as principal secretary to Chief of the Naval Staff and director-general Naval Intelligence, in addition to commanding 2 Zulfiquar-class frigate.

Career
Amjad Khan Niazi was commissioned in Operations Branch of Pakistan Navy in 1985 and also won the coveted Sword of Honour upon completion of initial training at Pakistan Naval Academy in Karachi.

His command appointments include Commander, Pakistan Fleet, Commanding Officer of PNS Badr and PNS Tariq, 18th Destroyer Squadron Commander, Commandant PNS Bahadur and Commandant Pakistan Navy War College/ Commander Central Punjab, Lahore.

Chief of Naval Staff
On October 7, 2020, the President of Pakistan Arif Alvi appointed Amjad Khan Niazi the Chief of Naval Staff of Pakistan.

Awards and decorations

Foreign decorations

Dates of rank

References 

 

Pakistan Navy admirals
Pakistan Naval Academy alumni
Living people
Year of birth missing (living people)
Place of birth missing (living people)